Gilla an Choimded Ó Duillénnáin (died 1229/30) was an Irish cleric.

Ó Duillénnáin was a coarb or erenagh of Saint Feichin, though at what foundation is uncertain. 
Places connected with Féchín's cult include: Fore Abbey (Co. Westmeath), Cong Abbey (Co. Mayo), Omey Island (Co. Galway), Ardoilén/High Island (Co. Galway), Inishmaan (Co. Galway), Claddaghduff (Co. Galway), Cleggan (Co. Galway) and Termonfeckin (Co. Louth). 

The Annals of Connacht record his death, sub anno 1229:

 Gilla an Choimded O Duillennain, coarb of St. Fechin ... died.

The Annals of Ulster contain more detail:

 U1230.6 Gilla-in-Coimdedh Ua Duillennain, successor of St. Feichin and abbot of the Monastery of Canons of Es-dara, rested in Christ.

References
 http://www.ucc.ie/celt/published/T100011/index.html

Medieval Gaels from Ireland
13th-century Irish Roman Catholic priests
Christian clergy from County Mayo
People from County Louth
Christian clergy from County Galway
People from County Westmeath
1229 deaths
Year of birth unknown